The Rough Guide to True Crime is a non-fiction paperback reference guide to national and international true crime cases by American crime writer Cathy Scott. It was released in the UK and US in August 2009 by Penguin Books through its Rough Guides imprint.

Summary 
The Rough Guide to True Crime is a compilation of a variety of cases, including historic crimes, with sections broken down by the type of offenses and who committed them. It includes black-and-white photos as illustration. Psychological profiles are included throughout by forensic expert Dr. Louis B. Schlesinger, who explains the psychology of serial killers, murderers, hit men and burglars. The book features serial killer Jeffrey Dahmer, mob hitman Richard "The Iceman" Kuklinski, John Wayne Glover "The Granny Killer," and British "Doctor of Death" Harold Shipman.

Scott's story from The Rough Guide to True Crime about mob enforcer Herbert Blitzstein was selected for inclusion in the July 2012 retrospective of crime writing, Masters of True Crime: Chilling Stories of Murder and the Macabre.

The author appeared on BlogTalkRadio's "True Murder" show and described some of the crimes included in the book that were committed in the 19th century as "a different time in America, where people like Billy the Kid could walk in and just rob a bank" and get away with it. And while "there was nothing glamorous about what they did, they are a part of lore."

Critical reception 
The book was featured at BookExpo America 2009's trade fair in DK Publishing's booth in New York City.

In a review, True Crime Book Reviews wrote, "From the Moors murders and Harold Shipman, to the murder of 2pac, this guide illuminates the psychology in play behind the most intriguing crimes in history, from the absurd to the appalling. The Rough Guide to True Crime explores the best of the haunting genre of True Crime."

Contents 
Outlaws: "The money, or your life"
Heists and Robberies
Kidnapped
White-collar Crime
Deception: The Art of the Con
Homicide
Serial Killers
Organized Crime
Dirty Cops and Bad Apples
Lesser Violations
Cybercrime

References

External links 
 The Rough Guide to True Crime in libraries (WorldCat catalog)
 Penguin's Rough Guide to True Crime book page
 Book excerpt, "Los Angeles Street Gangs: Bloods & Crips"
 Amazon's book page

American non-fiction books
British non-fiction books
Non-fiction crime books
Penguin Press books
2009 non-fiction books
Crime reference works
History books about crime
Non-fiction books about criminals
Books by Cathy Scott